is a Japanese actor and fashion model. He belongs to the talent agency Burning Production.

Career
In 2007, Miura joined the 20th Junon Superboy Contest, and won the Photogenic Award as well as the Ideal Lover Award. Before he won these awards and started as an actor, he had appeared on television variety programs in 2006. He was on TBS's E Musume! four times and a regular on NTV's Good Lookin' Club.

He debuted in 2008 as an actor in the drama series Gokusen 3, and was selected to play the role of one of the main students. He went on to make his debut on the big screen playing the same role in the movie continuation of the drama series, in Gokusen The Movie.

In 2010, he had his first starring role in a stage play titled Samurai 7. It was his first time acting in a stage play.

In 2011, Miura won the Best New Actor Award at the 34th Japan Academy Prize for Umizaru 3: The Last Message.

Appearances

TV dramas
 Gokusen 3 (NTV, 2008) as Shunsuke Kamiya
 Giragira (TV Asahi, 2008) as Shoji
 Gokusen 3 SP (NTV, 2009) as Shunsuke Kamiya
 Tumbling (TBS, 2010) as Ryosuke Tsukimori
 Toilet no Kamisama (MBS, 2011) as Daisuke
 School!! (Fuji TV, 2011) as Yuichi Motoki
 Shima Shima (TBS, 2011) as Gai Tamabuki
 Marumo no Okite (Fuji TV, 2011) as Shuichi Nakatsu (special appearance)
 Hanazakari no Kimitachi e 2011 (Fuji TV, 2011) as Shuichi Nakatsu
 Hungry! (KTV, 2012) as Taku Hiratsuka
 Cleopatra na Onnatachi (NTV, 2012) as Shoji Tomisaka
 Beautiful Rain (Fuji TV, 2012) as Akio Katsuta
 Flat Out Tokyo Girl (NTV, 2012) as Daisuke Tamagawa 
 Saki (Fuji TV, 2013) as Hayato Nitta
 Shomuni 2013 (Fuji TV, 2013) as Daisuke Samon
 Ashita, Mama ga Inai (NTV, 2014) as Locker
 Gokuako Ganbo (Fuji TV, 2014) as Takemoto Kazuma
 Ghost writer (Fuji TV, 2015) as Oda Hayato
 Hotel Concierge (TBS, 2015) as Kazuma Honjo
 Angel Heart (NTV, 2015) as Xin-Hong
 A Girl & Three Sweethearts (2016) as Chiaki Shibasaki 
 Please Love The Useless Me (TBS, 2016) as Daichi Mogami
 Fugitive Boys (Fuji TV, 2017) as Naruo Iimuro
 Ms. Justice (NTV, 2018) as Hitoshi Otsuka
 Legal V Ex-lawyer Shoko Takanashi (TV Asahi, 2018) as Akira Kayano
 M: Beloved One (TV Asahi, 2020) as Masa
 Love Begins When the Money Ends (TBS, 2020) as Ken Saotome
 The Fugitive (TV Asahi, 2020) as Wataru Kamoi
 Ano Toki Kiss Shite Okeba (TV Asahi, 2021) as Haruto Takamizawa
 Police in a Pod (NTV, 2021) as Seiji Minamoto
 Shin Shinchō Kōki (NTV, 2022) as Masamune Date

Movies
 Gokusen The Movie (2009) as Shunsuke Kamiya
 Real Onigokko 2 (2010) as Hiroshi Sato
 Umizaru 3: The Last Message (2010) as Takuya Hattori
 Umizaru 4: Brave Hearts (2012) as Takuya Hattori
 The Liar and His Lover (2013) as Shun Sakaguchi
 Daytime Shooting Star (2017) as Satsuki Shishio
 Godai - The Wunderkind (2020) as Sakamoto Ryōma
 Looking for Magical Doremi (2020) as Ryuichi Omiya (voice)
 Usogui (2022) as Ikki Sadakuni

Mobile dramas
 100 Scene no Koi Vol.3 Episode 1 "Love Song wo Kimi ni" (Voltage Inc, 2008) (special appearance)

Other programs
 E Musume! (TBS, 2006)
 Good Lookin' Club (NTV, 2006)
 Gokusen Eiga-ka Kinen 7nenkan no Rekishi Subete Misemasu SP (NTV, 2009)

Stage plays
 Samurai 7 (2010) as Katsushirou

References

External links
 
 Shohei Miura Official Website - 

1988 births
Living people
Japanese male film actors
Japanese male models
Japanese male stage actors
Japanese male television actors
Male actors from Tokyo
Models from Tokyo Metropolis
21st-century Japanese male actors